Konstantin Märska ( in Kuressaare, Saaremaa, Governorate of Livonia, Russian Empire – 30 August 1951 in Tallinn) was an Estonian cinematographer and film director.

Märska is buried at the Rahumäe cemetery in Tallinn.

References

External links

1896 births
1951 deaths
People from Kuressaare
People from the Governorate of Livonia
Estonian cinematographers
Estonian film directors
Burials at Rahumäe Cemetery